The 1995 North Down by-election, in the North Down constituency, was held on 15 June, following the death of James Kilfedder, who had represented the constituency since the 1970 general election. Kilfedder had formed the Ulster Popular Unionist Party in 1980, but the party disintegrated on his death.

History
The North Down constituency was created in 1950, and had consistently returned Unionist MPs with large majorities. It had also seen some of the Alliance Party of Northern Ireland's strongest results, peaking at 22.1% of the vote in the 1983 general election, and in the 1992 general election, it had seen the Conservative Party's best result in Northern Ireland, picking up 32.0% of the vote.

In 1995, North Down was the wealthiest constituency in the province, and had one of the lowest Catholic populations. As a result, neither the Social Democratic and Labour Party nor Sinn Féin, the two parties most closely associated with the Catholic community in Northern Ireland, had regularly stood candidates in the constituency, and neither chose to stand in the by-election.

Candidates
Bob McCartney had stood in the constituency for the Ulster Unionist Party in 1983, when he had come third with 20.3% of the vote. In 1987 he fell out with the party when he refused to withdraw and give Kilfedder a free run on a joint platform of opposition to the Anglo-Irish Agreement, instead running as a "Real Unionist". McCartney now announced his intention to stand in the election, as a UK Unionist. Despite their differences, he gained the tacit backing of the Democratic Unionist Party, who had won only 9.8% of the vote in 1992 and chose not to stand their own candidate.

The Ulster Unionist Party had not run a candidate in North Down since Bob McCartney in 1983, but they believed they were best placed to take Kilfedder's personal vote. They chose to run Alan McFarland, a former Army Officer and then Parliamentary secretary to some of their MPs, in preference to Reg Empey, one of their most prominent members. The Alliance Party selected Oliver Napier, their former party leader, hoping his experience and notability would regain some of the votes which they had lost in the 1992 election. The Conservative Party had suffered a dramatic loss of votes in the local elections, and their candidate in the 1992 election had moved away, but they chose Stuart Sexton, a member from Croydon in South London.

Four other candidates stood. Alan Chambers, a local councillor, ran as an independent Unionist. The Natural Law Party stood James Anderson, their leader in Northern Ireland, Michael Brooks who had previously stood as an "Ulster Protestant" candidate in the 1987 Irish general election in Donegal North-East, stood on a platform to "Free Para Lee Clegg Now", and Christopher Carter stood as Ulster's Independent Voice.

The big story of the campaign was from The Guardian, who announced that if McCartney was elected, he would apply for the Labour Party whip, an unusual move for a unionist, who were more usually associated with the Conservatives.

Result
The results gave McCartney a win, which he claimed was a victory for left-right politics, as opposed to sectarian politics, with the Ulster Unionists a disappointed distant second. Shortly after the election, James Molyneaux retired as their leader, and was replaced by David Trimble.

The Alliance came third, with their best ever share of the vote in the constituency. Chambers also saved his deposit, but the Conservatives received what was their worst vote in any UK Parliamentary election since 1918.

The by-election was the first since the Fermanagh and South Tyrone by-election of April 1981 where a seat transferred between two candidates from outside the major parties, and the first since the North Down by-election of 1986 won by a minor party.

References

External links
Campaign literature from the by-election
The 1995 North Down by-election: A Personal Account

North Down by-election
By-elections to the Parliament of the United Kingdom in County Down constituencies
20th century in County Down
1995 elections in Northern Ireland
North Down by-election